Ramathipadi I (1614 – 1659), also known as Ponhea Chan, Cau Bana Cand, Botum Reachea I or Sultan Ibrahim (Jawi: سلطان إبراهيم), reigning from 1642 to 1658, was the first and only Cambodian king to convert to Islam. Ramathipadi I was the third son of Chey Chettha II.

Biography

Accession to the throne and conversion 
After the death of King Ang Tong Reachea in 1640, his uncle Barom Reachea placed his own son on the throne as Batum Reachea I (Ang Non). With the help of Muslim merchants from Malaya, and the support of Vietnamese queen Ngoc Van, Ponhea Chan murdered his cousin Ang Non I as well as his uncle Barom Reachea in 1642, and ascended the throne as Botum Reachea I.

He converted to Islam and changed his name to Sultan Ibrahim. Ramathipadi I was strongly influenced by the life and practise of Muslim Malay merchants. During his reign, Phnom Penh was still a place of considerable profit: merchants came from all over the region, Japanese Christians found refuge in Cambodia as well as Chinese, swelled by the arrival of Ming loyalists after the dynasty's fall in 1644, who formed the largest foreign community in Cambodia. In the 1630s, the Dutch East India Company established a post in Phnom Penh, mainly for the purchase of deerskins; the governor general at the time was Anthony van Diemen. However, tensions rose among groups representing various interests: Dutch, Portuguese, and Malays. Ramathipadi planned to drive out the Dutch East India Company. In 1643, the Cambodian–Dutch War broke out. The representatives the Dutch East India Company were massacred and the remainder imprisoned, according to Dutch sources, at the instigation of the rival Portuguese.

Popular resentment 
However, most Cambodians were Buddhist and wanted to overthrow him, and sought help from Vietnamese Nguyễn lords. In 1658, King Narai of Siam prepared to invade Cambodia from the West, encouraging Ang So to lead a rebellion from the East against Ramathipadi I.

In 1658, a Vietnamese army invaded Cambodia, deposed him, and imprisoned him in Quảng Bình. He died in the next year, probably killed by Vietnamese or died of disease.

Aftermath 
After his assassination, Chan's three sons took refuge in Siam. The following years were marked by almost unceasing conflict as court politics were factionalized between those linked to Ayutthaya and those who were pro-Vietnamese, while hopes of stability were further undermined by another Nguyen invasion in 1673.

Politics

The growing influence of Vietnam on Cambodia 
During the reign of Ramathipadi I, the Vietnamese influence grew even greater over the political life of Cambodia and became another factor of instability. Nguyễn Phúc Ngọc Vạn, a consort of his father, who had supported his ascension to the throne at an early stage, preserved her position as "queen mother" with her own palace and court. She continued to deflect tentative Khmer efforts to regain Prei Nokor, and Kampong Krabei. She also protected the two surviving sons of Barom Reachea, Ang So and Ang Tan. Vietnamese merchants became more active in Cambodia at this time, particularly buying rice needed to supply the heavily militarized population among the walls on their northern frontier.

Legacy 
In present-day Cambodia, Ramathipadi I is an important figure for the Cham community in Cambodia, as he suggests a long relationship between Cham and Khmer, although many people are not aware of it.

Historiography 
The life of Ramathipadi I is primarily known through three different contemporary sources: Royal Chronicles of Cambodia, diaries of Dutch merchants, and reports of French missionaries.

Royal Chronicles of Cambodia from 1594 to 1677 were edited and published by Mak Phoeun in 1981 with the support of the Ecole française d'Extrême-Orient, but historians such as Michael Vickery or Sok Khin have criticized their accuracy.

For the period that includes the reign of Ramathipadi I, there are also Dutch sources, all based on reports by Dutch East Indies Company officials, though these have a gap concerning Cambodia caused by the temporary abandoning of trade with Cambodia following the 1643 massacre and failed punitive expedition of 1644.

French missionaries mentioned Ramathipadi I and his conversion to Islam in their reports own from 1682 to 1685.

References

Bibliography 
 

1614 births
1659 deaths
17th-century Cambodian monarchs
Converts to Islam from Buddhism
Muslim monarchs
Usurpers
Dethroned monarchs
Cambodian Muslims
Cambodian people of Laotian descent